In poetry, internal rhyme, or middle rhyme, is rhyme that occurs within a single line of verse, or between internal phrases across multiple lines. By contrast, rhyme between line endings is known as end rhyme.

Internal rhyme schemes can be denoted with spaces or commas between lines. For example,  denotes a three-line poem with the same internal rhyme on each line, and the same end rhyme on each line (which does not rhyme with the internal rhyme).

Examples 

The following example is in limerick form. Each stressed syllable rhymes with another stressed syllable using one of three rhyme sets. Each rhyme set is indicated by a different highlight color. Note that the yellow rhyme set provides internal rhyme in lines 1, 2, and 5, and end rhymes in lines 3 and 4, whereas the blue set is entirely internal and the pink is exclusively end rhymes.

Each time alie  for a 
She well  that her  are the 
But this  will ex

Percy Dearmer (1867–1936) revised John Bunyan's (1628–1688) poem "To Be a Pilgrim" in 1906. It became a popular hymn when Charles Winfred Douglas (1867–1944) set it to music in 1917. Here are Dearmer's lyrics, with the internal rhymes in bold. Notice that in these three quatrains the internal rhymes are also echoed in the line rhymes (also in bold).

He who would valiant be ’gainst all disaster,
Let him in constancy follow the Master.
There’s no discouragement shall make him once relent
His first avowed intent to be a pilgrim.

Who so beset him round with dismal stories
Do but themselves confound—his strength the more is.
No foes shall stay his might; though he with giants fight,
He will make good his right to be a pilgrim.

Since, Lord, Thou dost defend us with Thy Spirit,
We know we at the end, shall life inherit.
Then fancies flee away! I’ll fear not what men say,
I’ll labor night and day to be a pilgrim.

W. S. Gilbert (1836–1911) used internal rhyme in some of the songs of his operas. One notable example is that of Bunthorne's solo aria from the opera Patience, which begins:

If you're anxious for to shine in the high aesthetic line
As a man of culture rare,
You must get up all the germs of the transcendental terms,
And plant them everywhere.
You must lie upon the daisies and discourse in novel phrases
Of your complicated state of mind,
The meaning doesn't matter if it's only idle chatter
Of a transcendental kind.

Internal rhyme schemes were extremely common in popular song of the Swing Era.  One familiar example is the bridge from "Don't Fence Me In", written by Cole Porter for the film Hollywood Canteen in 1944:
Just turn me loose let me straddle my old saddle,
Underneath the western skies,
On my cayuse let me wander over yonder,
'Til I see the mountains rise.

Internal rhyme is used extensively in rap and hip-hop music, where it sometimes overlaps with assonance.  The usage of internal rhyme in rap has increased over time, but can be found even in the earliest rap songs, such as the Sugarhill Gang's 1979 single, "Rapper's Delight":
I'm six-foot-one and I'm tons of fun and I dress to a T
You see, I got more clothes than Muhammad Ali and I dress so viciously
I got body guards, I got two big cars, I definitely ain't the whack
I got a Lincoln Continental and a sun-roofed Cadillac
So after school, I take a dip in the pool, which is really on the wall
I got a color TV, so I can see the Knicks play basketball

Internal rhyme is used frequently by many different hip-hop artists, including Kool Moe Dee, Big Daddy Kane, Nas, and Rakim, as demonstrated in Eric B. and Rakim's 1987 piece, "My Melody" from their debut album Paid In Full:

My unusual style will confuse you a while
If I were water, I'd flow in the Nile
So many rhymes you won't have time to go for yours
Just because of applause I have to pause
Right after tonight is when I prepare
To catch another sucker-duck MC out there
My strategy has to be tragedy, catastrophe
And after this you'll call me your majesty...[ allmusic ((( Rakim > Biography )))]. Allmusic. Accessed May 22, 2008.

Another prominent hip-hop artist who uses complex internal rhymes is AZ, as shown in "The Format":

Young and gifted, my tongue's prolific
In the beach bungalow is how I brung in Christmas
To the streets I'mma flow from the hungriest districts
Swiss kicks crisp when I come to them picnics
Play slow, paper chase stack and lay low
Range rove tinted all black the same old
Psychic mind, righteous rhymes that turned a new leaf from a life of crime
No concerns with new beef, who's as nice as I'm
It's confirmed, from few feet I'm still a sniper blind
Built my fame, spilt my pain
Politicking daily, still trying to milk the game
It's obvious that I'm real, rap skills remain
I took some change and I'm still the same

Black Thought, rapper from The Roots, uses internal rhymes in the song "Respond/React".

The attractive assassin, blastin the devil trespassin
Master gettin cash in an orderly fashion
Message to the fake n**** flashin
Slow up Ahk, before you get dropped and closed like a caption
Fractional kids don't know the time for action
Styles got the rhythm that of an Anglo-Saxon
Round of applause, an avalanche of clappin
{*BLOW*} that's what happen, now what's your reaction
We heavyweight traction, pro-pornographin
Specialize in science and math and, original black man
Bustin thoughts that pierce your mental
The fierce rippin your sacks and
Vocal toe to toe impeccable splittin your back son
Simple as addition and subtraction
Black Thought, the infinite relaxed one
Shorties say they love it with a passion
Bring the international charm, see a squad I harass

The Beatles use internal rhyme in their song "Hey Jude".

Hey Jude, don't make it bad
Take a sad song and make it better
Remember to let her into your heart
Then you can start to make it better

Hey Jude, don't be afraid
You were made to go out and get her
The minute you let her under your skin
Then you begin to make it better

MF Doom uses almost every word as internal rhymes in this verse in his song, "Figaro". (Rhymes highlighted)

It's    ,    
  ?       ?
  ,  
 ,  
Not  
     through  
   how   with 

Kool Keith heavily utilises internal rhyme in his song "3000" to effectively throw off the listener.

As studies have shown; participator acts , 
And mess up water  the  that comes from the 
In the  the  you ,  ence
What is  you , ing 
That you , you think it's  won't go inum
Or even turn , sell the 
Your homey's tape  
You my , my  chicken  on the 
Open your  and see  
Rap moves on to the year three thousand!

See also

 Off-centred rhyme

References

Rhyme